A cama is a hybrid between a male dromedary camel and a female llama, and has been produced via artificial insemination at the Camel Reproduction Centre in Dubai. The first cama was born on January 14, 1998. The aim was to create an animal capable of higher wool production than the llama, with the size and strength of a camel and a cooperative temperament.

Breeding

The crossing was initially reported by The Ogdensburg Journal in 1871.

The dromedary has 74 diploid chromosomes, the same as other camelids. The autosomes consist of five pairs of small to medium-sized metacentrics and submetacentrics. The X chromosome is the largest in the metacentric and submetacentric group. There are 31 pairs of acrocentrics. The dromedary's karyotype is similar to that of the Bactrian camel.

As an adult dromedary camel can weigh up to six times as much as a llama, the hybrid needs to be produced by artificial insemination. Insemination of a female llama with sperm from a male dromedary camel has been the only successful combination. Inseminating a female camel with llama sperm has not produced viable offspring.

The first cama showed signs of becoming sexually mature at age four, when he showed a desire to breed with a female guanaco and a female llama. He was also a behavioral disappointment, displaying an extremely poor temperament. The second cama, a female named Kamilah, was successfully born in 2002. As of April 2008, five camas had been produced.

Food and drink
Much like camels, camas are herbivores that eat shrubs and other plant matter. As they can drink large amounts of water at a time, camas can survive with little or no water for long periods.

Comparison of camelids
The camelid family consists of the Old World camelids (the dromedary camels, Bactrian camels, and wild Bactrian camels) and the New World camelids (the llama, vicuna, suri alpaca, huacaya alpaca, and guanaco). Though there have been successful and fertile hybrids within each major groups of camelids, the cama marks the first instance of cross-breeding between the two groups. The following is a table comparing some of the characteristics of camelids.

See also
Hybrid camel
Huarizo

References

Camelid hybrids
Intergeneric hybrids